Bulayima Mukuayanzo (born 26 January 1969) is a retired Congolese football goalkeeper. He was a squad member at the 1994 Africa Cup of Nations.

References

1969 births
Living people
Democratic Republic of the Congo footballers
Democratic Republic of the Congo international footballers
1994 African Cup of Nations players
Daring Club Motema Pembe players
Feyenoord players
RBC Roosendaal players
Yanbian Funde F.C. players
Association football goalkeepers
Democratic Republic of the Congo expatriate footballers
Expatriate footballers in the Netherlands
Democratic Republic of the Congo expatriate sportspeople in the Netherlands
Expatriate footballers in China
Democratic Republic of the Congo expatriate sportspeople in China
21st-century Democratic Republic of the Congo people